Kenneth Woodrow Gunning (June 4, 1914 – April 2, 1991) was an American professional basketball player and college coach. He played in the National Basketball League (NBL) for the Whiting Ciesar All-Americans in 15 games during the 1937–38 NBL season, and also in one game for the Indianapolis Kautskys in 1945–46.

A native of Shelbyville, Indiana, Gunning lettered for the Indiana Hoosiers men's basketball team from 1934 to 1935 through 1936–37. He led the team in scoring all three seasons, was twice named an All-Big Ten Conference player, and as a senior was named a second-team NCAA All-American by Omaha World-Herald. He also lettered for the baseball and track teams.

After his lone season with the Whiting Ciesar All-Americans, Gunning coached Western New Mexico University (WNMU) for 10 seasons (1938–1948), followed by a three-season stint leading Wichita State University (1948–1951). During his time at WNMU, Gunning played also semi-professional baseball in 1939 for the Moline Plow Boys of the Illinois–Indiana–Iowa League. He also coached Wichita State's baseball team for three years.

References

1914 births
1991 deaths
All-American college men's basketball players
American men's basketball players
Baseball players from Indiana
Basketball coaches from Indiana
Basketball players from Indiana
Forwards (basketball)
Guards (basketball)
High school basketball coaches in the United States
Indiana Hoosiers baseball players
Indiana Hoosiers men's basketball players
Indianapolis Kautskys players
Moline Plow Boys players
People from Shelbyville, Indiana
Western New Mexico Mustangs men's basketball coaches
Whiting Ciesar All-Americans players
Wichita State Shockers baseball coaches
Wichita State Shockers men's basketball coaches